Martha Bernal may refer to:
 Martha E. Bernal (1931–2001),  American clinical psychologist
 Martha Patricia Bernal (born 1965), Mexican politician